Konser Tur 2001 is an Indonesian album by Chrisye released in 2001 by Musica Studios. It is Chrisye's eighteenth studio album. Although the album is titled Konser Tur 2001, it was not recorded live; the title "Konser Tur" was chosen to coincide with Chrisye's tour in 2001. It included two new songs and reissues of some of Chrisye's more popular songs. The music video for one of the two new songs, "Setia" became controversial for its depiction of a woman dancing in tight clothing.

Creation
Konser Tur 2001 was recorded to coincide with Chrisye's 2001 concert tour from 28 April to 22 May. Although it was named Konser Tur 2001, it is not a live recording of a concert; it is a studio album with two original songs and thirteen of his earlier hits, from Sabda Alam to Kala Cinta Menggoda. Chrisye stated that it was meant for his fans, in order for them to revisit his old songs.

Track listing

Release

The album was released in 2001. At the same time, music videos for "Andai Aku Bisa" and "Setia" were released.

The music video for "Setia" raised controversy when it was released. Critics thought that some of the imagery, including a girl in a tight shirt and feathers, went "against Eastern culture". Chrisye, the video's director Rizal Mantovani, and the producer Indrawati Wijaya stated that it could be changed if necessary and logical reasons were given, but they considered it suitable for broadcast. It was released unchanged.

In 2004, Musica Studios reissued Konser Tur 2001 along with 21 of Chrisye's other albums.

References

2001 albums
Indonesian-language albums
Chrisye albums